Yum Yum is a 2004 album by The Twin. It was released as a limited CD edition of 5000 copies and was originally sold through some official websites. The album has since been made available on various digital sites.

Overview
The Twin was a musical project by singer Boy George which was influenced by the then current electro scene. The Twin was an alter ego created to produce edgier music, using lyrically aggressive themes. It was also inspired by Leigh Bowery, George's late friend and the role the singer was playing in the Taboo musical at the time.

The album contains thirteen tracks, some in heavily remixed form. Prior to the album, four limited 7" vinyl singles were issued as singles for "Here Come the Girls", "Electro Hetero", "Sanitised" and "Human Racing". "Sanitized" was then re-released as a limited 12" with different remixes. After the release of this album, no further singles were released to promote it.

After many delayed dates, this collection of tracks was released in December 2004 on two websites, on Boy George's independent label More Protein and on Boy George's clothing label, B-Rude. Further remixes and unreleased tracks were promised by Boy George to be included on a "The Twin" DVD called Straight to DVD, which was never published.

Track listing
All tracks composed by George O'Dowd (Boy George) and Kinky Roland; except where indicated
 "Here Cum the Girls" – 6:39
 "Yum Yum" – 6:23
 "Electro Hetero" – 4:22
 "Disco Ugly" – 4:28
 "Size Queen" – 5:45
 "Human Racing" – 3:58
 "So Much Love" – 3:45
 "Sanitised" – 7:05
 "Fire-Desire" (Featuring Avenue D) – 3:47
 "Garden of Eden" – 6:01
 "Who Made U?" – 5:52
 "Never Over U" – 6:15
 "After Dark" – 6:18

Personnel
Boy George – lead vocals
Kinky Roland – keyboards, programming, mixing
Avenue D – guest rapping

2004 albums
Boy George albums